The London Conservative Party mayoral selection of 2010 was the process by which the Conservative Party selected its candidate for Mayor of London, to stand in the 2012 mayoral election. Incumbent Mayor Boris Johnson was selected to stand.

Candidates

Boris Johnson, Mayor of London

Result

Johnson was endorsed as the party's candidate unopposed after a party meeting.

See also
2012 London mayoral election

References

Conservative Party (UK)
Mayoral elections in London
Conservative Party mayoral selection
London Conservative Party mayoral selection
London Conservative Party mayoral selection
Boris Johnson